The Volvo Scalable Product Architecture (SPA) platform is a global, full-size, unibody automobile platform developed and manufactured by Volvo Cars. It debuted in 2014 when the second-generation Volvo XC90 was released.  Work on the new in-house platform began in 2011 shortly after Volvo was acquired by Geely from Ford Motor Company.  During development, particular emphasis was placed on achieving weight-reduction, design commonality, manufacturing rationalization, and hybridization opportunities.  The new SPA platform replaced two prior vehicle architectures, the Volvo P2 platform and Volvo P3 platform. 

With SPA, Volvo claims it "enables significant improvements when it comes to offering protection in worst-case scenarios and when creating innovative features that support the driver in avoiding accidents." Volvo has invested 90 billion SEK in the platform.

All SPA based cars will be delivered with 4 cylinder engines. The diesel and petrol engines share the same Volvo Engine Architecture, and Volvo can build 530,000 engines per year.

Vehicles

References

2014 introductions
Scalable Product Architecture platform